Marlène Habata Zebango is an African politician who was a Minister for Youth and Sports in the government of Burkina Faso between 1991 and 1993.

References

Living people
Year of birth missing (living people)
Government ministers of Burkina Faso
Place of birth missing (living people)
20th-century women politicians
Women government ministers of Burkina Faso
21st-century Burkinabé people